Nicola Green ( Bethwaite, born 12 May 1955) is an Australian sailor. She competed for Australia at two Olympic Games, in 1988 in the Women's Two Person Dinghy (470) and in 2004 in the three-person Yngling class.

She is the daughter of pilot, yachtsman, yacht designer and meteorologist Frank Bethwaite and the sister of fellow Olympian Mark Bethwaite.

References

External Links
 

1955 births
Living people
Australian female sailors (sport)
Olympic sailors of Australia
Sailors at the 1988 Summer Olympics – 470
Sailors at the 2004 Summer Olympics – Yngling